Whitfield, Mississippi may refer to the following places in the U.S. state of Mississippi:

Whitfield, Jones County, Mississippi, an unincorporated community
Whitfield, Rankin County, Mississippi, an unincorporated community